This list of botanical gardens and arboretums is intended to include all significant botanical gardens and arboretums in the U.S. territory Puerto Rico

See also

List of botanical gardens and arboretums in the United States

References 

 
Arboreta in the United States
Botanical gardens and arboretums
Tourist attractions in Puerto Rico